Bilateral relations between South Korea and Afghanistan began in 1973.

On September 17, 1978, Afghanistan's pro-Soviet Khalq government announced that it would break off relations and instead recognize only the Democratic People's Republic of Korea (North Korea). A North Korean delegation visited Afghanistan in October 1978.

South Korea was engaged in helping Afghanistan recover from years of civil war in the 2000s and 2010s. South Korea has an embassy in Kabul. Afghanistan established its embassy in Seoul in 2004.

In 2007, the two countries gained wide attention because of the Taliban hostage crisis in Afghanistan.
The Taliban extremists promised to release the rest of the team safely only when Seoul promised to stick to the planned withdrawal from Afghanistan by the end of 2007.

References

External links
 Embassy of South Korea to Afghanistan - website
 Embassy of Afghanistan to South Korea - website

 
South Korea
Bilateral relations of South Korea